Ángel Garrido García (born 7 April 1964) is a Spanish politician who served as President of the Community of Madrid between April 2018 and April 2019. He was a member of the People's Party until 24 April 2019, only four days ahead of the 2019 Spanish general election, when he announced he was joining Citizens.

Biography

Early life 
Born on 7 April 1964 in Madrid, his father was from Ávila while his mother came from Jaén. He took his basic education at the Tajamar School, a centre for males linked to the Opus Dei located in the current district of Puente de Vallecas. He took his college education at the Technical University of Madrid's School of Mining Engineering, where he graduated as mining engineer. He worked in the private sector in the area of logistics.

Municipal politics 
Briefly affiliated to the Democratic and Social Centre (CDS), he joined the People's Party (PP) in 1991; he also joined the New Generations youth wing. Endorsed within the party ranks by Feliciano Blázquez, he ran third in the party list for the 1995 municipal election in Pinto and was elected councillor for the 1995–1999 period, his first public office. He became the PP's spokesperson in the plenary of the city council.

He was included in the PP list for the 1999 Madrid municipal election headed by José María Álvarez del Manzano. Elected as municipal councillor, he began his 16-year spell in the city council of the Spanish capital. He was subsequently re-elected in the 2003, 2007 and 2011 elections. Throughout this period, he presided over the districts of Villa de Vallecas, Latina, Chamberí, Usera and Retiro. From 2004 to 2008, Garrido was also a member of the Executive Secretariat of Regional Policy of the People's Party of the Community of Madrid, where he befriended Cristina Cifuentes and Jaime González Taboada.

Member of the regional government 

After the 2015 election to the Assembly of Madrid in which he ran second in the candidature of the People's Party after Cristina Cifuentes, he was assigned to negotiate the investiture of the later as regional president with Citizens.

After the resignation of Esperanza Aguirre as leader of the regional branch of the PP in February 2016, he was appointed President of the Electoral Committee.

After the celebration of the regional Congress of March 2017, he was elected at the Comité Ejecutivo Autonómico of People's Party of the Community of Madrid, presided by Cristina Cifuentes as Secretrary.

Presidency of the Community of Madrid 
On 25 April 2018 Cifuentes resigned as President of the Community of Madrid, after the release of a 2011 video that shows her being detained in a supermarket for shoplifting, and in the wake of strong evidence that her Master's degree was fraudulently obtained. Ángel Garrido became then acting president of the regional government. Following his investiture by the regional parliament on 17–18 May, he was sworn into office on 21 May 2018. Once Isabel Díaz Ayuso was designated as the leader of the PP list in the upcoming 2019 Madrilenian regional election and Garrido was selected as candidate within the PP list for the 2019 European Parliament election, the latter handed in his resignation as regional president on 11 April 2019.

Electoral history

References 

|-

|-

1964 births
Living people
People's Party (Spain) politicians
Members of the 10th Assembly of Madrid
Polytechnic University of Madrid alumni
Madrid city councillors (2011–2015)
Madrid city councillors (2007–2011)
Madrid city councillors (2003–2007)
Madrid city councillors (1999–2003)
City councillors in the Community of Madrid
Presidents of the Community of Madrid
Government ministers of the Community of Madrid
Members of the People's Parliamentary Group (Assembly of Madrid)
Members of the 11th Assembly of Madrid